Divjak is a Serbo-Croatian surname. Notable people with the surname include:

Blaženka Divjak (born 1967), Croatian mathematician and politician
Boris Divjak (born 1972), macroeconomics consultant from Bosnia and Herzegovina
Jovan Divjak (1937–2021), Bosnian general in the Bosnian army
Zdravko Divjak (born 1956), Yugoslav swimmer

See also
Divac, surname
Divjakë, settlement in western Albania

Serbian surnames
Bosnian surnames